A food chain is a linear network of links in a food web starting from producer organisms (such as grass or algae which produce their own food via photosynthesis) and ending at an apex predator species (like grizzly bears or killer whales), detritivores (like earthworms or woodlice), or decomposer species (such as fungi or bacteria). A food chain also shows how organisms are related to each other by the food they eat. Each level of a food chain represents a different trophic level. A food chain differs from a food web because the complex network of different animals' feeding relations are aggregated and the chain only follows a direct, linear pathway of one animal at a time. Natural interconnections between food chains make it a food web.

Food chains were first introduced by the Arab scientist and philosopher Al-Jahiz in the 10th century and later popularized in a book published in 1927 by Charles Elton, which also introduced the food web concept.

A common metric used to quantify food web trophic structure is food chain length. In its simplest form, the length of a chain is the number of links between a trophic consumer and the base of the web. The mean chain length of an entire web is the arithmetic average of the lengths of all chains in the food web. The food chain is an energy source diagram. The food chain begins with a producer, which is eaten by a primary consumer. The primary consumer may be eaten by a secondary consumer, which in turn may be consumed by a tertiary consumer. The tertiary consumers may sometimes become prey to the top predators known as the quaternary consumers. For example, a food chain might start with a green plant as the producer, which is eaten by a snail, the primary consumer. The snail might then be the prey of a secondary consumer such as a frog, which itself may be eaten by a tertiary consumer such as a snake which in turn may be consumed by an eagle.

Food chains are very important for the survival of most species. When only one element is removed from the food chain it can result in extinction of a species in some cases. The foundation of the food chain consists of primary producers. Primary producers, or autotrophs, utilize energy derived from either sunlight or inorganic chemical compounds to create complex organic compounds, whereas species at higher trophic levels cannot and so must consume producers or other life that itself consumes producers. Because the sun's light is necessary for photosynthesis, most life could not exist if the sun disappeared. Even so, it has recently been discovered that there are some forms of life, chemotrophs, that appear to gain all their metabolic energy from chemosynthesis driven by hydrothermal vents, thus showing that some life may not require solar energy to thrive.

Decomposers, which feed on dead animals, break down the organic compounds into simple nutrients that are returned to the soil. These are the simple nutrients that plants require to create organic compounds. It is estimated that there are more than 100,000 different decomposers in existence.
 
Many food webs have a keystone species. A keystone species is a species that has a large impact on the surrounding environment and can directly affect the food chain. If this keystone species dies off it can set the entire food chain off balance. Keystone species keep herbivores from depleting all of the foliage in their environment and preventing mass extinction.

Length

The length of a food chain is a continuous variable providing a measure of the passage of energy and an index of ecological structure that increases through the linkages from the lowest to the highest trophic (feeding) levels.

Food chains are often used in ecological modeling (such as a three-species food chain). They are simplified abstractions of real food webs, but complex in their dynamics and mathematical implications.

Ecologists have formulated and tested hypotheses regarding the nature of ecological patterns associated with food chain length, such as length increasing with ecosystem volume, limited by the reduction of energy at each successive level, or reflecting habitat type.

Producers, such as plants, are organisms that utilize solar or chemical energy to synthesize starch. All food chains must start with a producer. In the deep sea, food chains centered on hydrothermal vents and cold seeps exist in the absence of sunlight. Chemosynthetic bacteria and archaea use hydrogen sulfide and methane from hydrothermal vents and cold seeps as an energy source (just as plants use sunlight) to produce carbohydrates; they form the base of the food chain. Consumers are organisms that eat other organisms. All organisms in a food chain, except the first organism, are consumers.

Food chain length is important because the amount of energy transferred decreases as trophic level increases; generally only ten percent of the total energy at one trophic level is passed to the next, as the remainder is used in the metabolic process. There are usually no more than five tropic levels in a food chain. Humans are able to receive more energy by going back a level in the chain and consuming the food before, for example getting more energy per pound from consuming a salad than an animal which ate lettuce.

The efficiency of a food chain depends on the energy first consumed by the primary producers. The primary consumer gets its energy from the producer and passes it to the secondary and tertiary consumers.

Food chain studies play an important role in ecotoxicology studies, which trace the pathways and biomagnification of environmental contaminants.

See also 

 Heterotroph
 Lithotroph
 Ecological pyramid
 Predator-prey interaction

References

Systems ecology